R (Daily Mail and General Trust plc) v HM Treasury and Commissioners of Inland Revenue (1988) Case 81/87 is an EU law case, concerning the freedom of establishment in the European Union.

Facts
The Daily Mail, a newspaper company, was resident in the United Kingdom. It wanted to transfer residence to the Netherlands and set up a subsidiary or branch in the UK instead. This was to be done for the purpose of selling a significant part of its non-permanent assets and using the sale proceeds to buy its own shares without having to pay the tax normally due on such transactions in the UK. It could not do this without permission from the UK Treasury. It argued this contravened its right of establishment under (what is now) the Treaty on the Functioning of the European Union article 49.

Judgment
The Court of Justice held that TFEU article 49 did not apply, and so the rules requiring UK Treasury permission could operate. Given the wide variation in national laws about the required factor connecting a company to the national territory for the purposes of incorporation, and also the wide variation of national laws on transfer of a company’s head office from one place to another, companies cannot rely on articles 49 and 54.

See also

European Union law
Wilson v UK

Notes

References

Court of Justice of the European Union case law